Āris Aldis Brīmanis (born March 14, 1972) is a Latvian-American former professional ice hockey defenseman from Shaker Heights, Ohio who played seven seasons in the National Hockey League (NHL).

Playing career
At junior level, Brimanis played for Bowling Green State University and then for the Brandon Wheat Kings of the Western Hockey League. He was drafted 86th overall by the Philadelphia Flyers in the 1991 NHL Entry Draft. As well as the Flyers, he also played for the New York Islanders, the Mighty Ducks of Anaheim and the St. Louis Blues. He played a total of 113 NHL games, scoring 2 goals and 12 assists for 14 points, collecting 57 penalty minutes. In 2005, Brimanis moved to the Swiss Nationalliga A, joining the Kloten Flyers where he spent 2 seasons before joining Hannover in 2007.

Brimanis spent four seasons with the Hannover Scorpions of the Deutsche Eishockey Liga before leaving as a free agent after the 2010–11 season.

Career statistics

References

External links
 

1972 births
American men's ice hockey defensemen
Bowling Green Falcons men's ice hockey players
Brandon Wheat Kings players
Cincinnati Mighty Ducks players
Chicago Wolves (IHL) players
Fredericton Canadiens players
Grand Rapids Griffins (IHL) players
Hannover Indians players
Hannover Scorpions players
Hershey Bears players
Ice hockey people from Cleveland
Kansas City Blades players
EHC Kloten players
Living people
Kalamazoo Wings (1974–2000) players
Mighty Ducks of Anaheim players
New York Islanders players
Philadelphia Flyers draft picks
Philadelphia Flyers players
Philadelphia Phantoms players
Providence Bruins players
St. Louis Blues players
Worcester IceCats players
Sportspeople from Shaker Heights, Ohio
American people of Latvian descent